The 41st Pennsylvania House of Representatives District is located in southern Pennsylvania and has been represented since 2015 by Brett Miller.

District profile
The 41st Pennsylvania House of Representatives District is located in Lancaster County and includes the following areas:

 Columbia
 East Hempfield Township
 Manor Township (part)
District Bethel 
District Hambright 
District West Lancaster
 Mountville
 West Hempfield Township

Representatives

Recent election results

References

External links
District map from the United States Census Bureau
Pennsylvania House Legislative District Maps from the Pennsylvania Redistricting Commission.  
Population Data for District 41 from the Pennsylvania Redistricting Commission.

Government of Lancaster County, Pennsylvania
41